The Heart of the Angel is a documentary made by director/producer Molly Dineen in 1989, before the 1992 renovation of the then 100-year-old Angel tube station on the London Underground. It was first screened in BBC2's 40 Minutes series on 23 November 1989.

The film follows 48 hours in the everyday lives of the people who work in the station, including London Underground foreman Ray Stocker, ticket-seller Derek Perkins, the groups of women called 'fluffers' who clean human hair out of the tracks to avoid the fire hazard, and the gangs of men who work with pickaxes in almost pitch-black conditions to renovate parts of the track in time for the following day.
 
This documentary was given the Documentary Award by the Royal Television Society, and is included in the first volume of The Molly Dineen Collection, released by the British Film Institute in 2011.

References

1989 films
British documentary films
Documentary films about rail transport
1989 documentary films
London Underground in popular culture
Documentary films about London
1980s English-language films
1980s British films